Slavic (American English) or Slavonic (British English) studies, also known as Slavistics is the academic field of area studies concerned with Slavic areas, languages, literature, history, and culture. Originally, a Slavist or Slavicist was primarily a linguist or philologist researching Slavistics. Increasingly, historians, social scientists, and other humanists who study Slavic area cultures and societies have been included in this rubric.

In North America, Slavic studies is dominated by Russian studies. Ewa Thompson, a professor of Slavic studies at Rice University, described the situation of non-Russian Slavic studies as "invisible and mute."

History
Slavistics emerged in late 18th and early 19th century, simultaneously with Romantic nationalisim among various Slavic nations, and ideological attempts to establish a common sense of Slavic community, exemplified by the Pan-Slavist movement. Among the first scholars to use the term was Josef Dobrovský (1753–1829).

The history of Slavic studies can be divided into three periods. 

Until 1876 the early Slavists concentrated on documentation and printing of monuments of Slavic languages, among them the first texts written in national languages. At this time the majority of Slavic languages received their first modern dictionaries, grammars and compendia. 

The second period, ending with World War I, featured the rapid development of Slavic philology and linguistics, most notably outside of Slavic countries themselves, in the circle formed around August Schleicher (1821–1868) and around August Leskien (1840–1916) at the University of Leipzig. At this time, Slavonic scholars focused on dialectology. 

After World War II there were developed centers of Slavic studies, and much greater expansion into other humanities and social science disciplines in various universities around the world. Indeed, partly due to the political concerns in Western European and the United States about the Cold War. Slavic studies flourished in the years from World War II into the 1990s, though university enrollments in Slavic languages have declined since then.

Subfields 
Following the traditional division of Slavs into three subgroups (eastern, southern, western), Slavic studies are also divided into three distinctive subfields:
 East Slavic studies, encompassing the study of East Slavic peoples and their linguistic, literary and other cultural and historical heritages.
 Belarusian studies, or Belarusistics;
 Russian studies, or Russistics;
 Rusyn studies, or Rusynistics; 
 Ukrainian studies, or Ukrainistics;
 South Slavic studies, encompassing the study of South Slavic peoples and their linguistic, literary and other cultural and historical heritages.
 Bosniac studies, or Bosniacistics;
 Bulgarian studies, or Bulgaristics;
 Croatian studies, or Croatistics;
 Macedonian studies, or Macedonistics;
 Montenegrin studies, or Montenegristics;
 Serbian studies, or Serbistics;
 Slovene studies, or Slovenistics;
 Yugoslav studies, or Yugoslavistics;
 West Slavic studies, encompassing the study of West Slavic peoples and their linguistic, literary and other cultural and historical heritages.
 Czech studies, or Bohemistics;
 Kashubian studies, or Kashubistics;
 Polish studies, or Polonistics;
 Slovak studies, or Slovakistics;
 Sorbian studies, or Sorbistics.

Slavic countries and areas of interest 
 By country:
 Belarus: language, literature, culture, history
 Bosnia and Herzegovina: language, literature, culture, history
 Bulgaria: language, literature, culture, history
 Croatia: language, literature, culture, history
 Czech Republic: language, literature, culture, history
 North Macedonia: language, literature, culture, history 
 Montenegro: language, literature, culture, history
 Poland: languages/dialects (Polish, Kashubian, Silesian), literature (Polish, Kashubian), culture, history
 Russia: language, literature, culture, history
 Serbia: language, literature, culture, history (national and ethnic)
 Slovakia: language, literature, culture, history
 Slovenia: language, literature, culture, history
 Ukraine: language, literature, culture, history
 Other languages: Serbo-Croatian, Upper Sorbian, Lower Sorbian, Kashubian, Polabian, Rusyn, Old Church Slavonic

Notable people 
Historical

 Johann Christoph Jordan, the author of an early scholarly work in Slavic studies
 Josef Dobrovský (1753–1829) from Bohemia
 Jernej Kopitar (1780–1840) from Slovenia
 Alexander Vostokov (1781–1864) from Russia
 Vuk Stefanović Karadžić (1787–1864) from Serbia
 Pavel Jozef Šafárik (1795–1861) from Slovakia
 Mykhaylo Maksymovych (1804–1873) from Ukraine
 Izmail Sreznevsky (1812–1880) from Russia
 Franz Miklosich (1813–1891) from Slovenia
 Fyodor Buslaev (1818–1898) from Russia
 August Schleicher (1821–1868) from Germany
 Đuro Daničić (1825–1882) from Serbia
 Anton Janežič (1828–1869) from Slovenia
 Alexander Potebnja (1835–1891) from Ukraine
 Vatroslav Jagić (1838–1923) from Croatia
 August Leskien (1840–1916) from Germany
 Jan Niecisław Baudouin de Courtenay (1845–1929) from Poland
 Filipp Fortunatov (1848–1914) from Russia
 Aleksander Brückner (1856–1939) from eastern Galicia.
 Matija Murko (1861–1952) from Slovenia
 Lyubomir Miletich (1863–1937) from Bulgaria/Macedonia
 Aleksey Shakhmatov (1864–1920) from Russia
 Antoine Meillet (1866–1936) from France]
 Holger Pedersen (1867–1953) from Denmark
   1869–1942) from Russia
  (1872–1954) from Slovenia
 Krste Misirkov (1874–1926) from Macedonia/Bulgaria/Russia
 Aleksandar Belić (1876–1960) from Serbia
  (1881–1967) from France
 Max Vasmer (1886–1962) from Russia
 André Vaillant (1890–1977) from France
 Dmytro Chyzhevsky (1894–1977) from Ukraine
 Roman Jakobson (1896–1982) from Russia
  (1897–1974) from Austria
 Zdzisław Stieber (1903–1980) from Poland
 Dmitry Likhachev (1906–1999) from Russia
 George Shevelov (1908–2002) from Ukraine
 Jaroslav Rudnyckyj (1910–1995) from eastern Galicia
 Stoyko Stoykov (1912–1969) from Bulgaria
 Horace G. Lunt (1918–2010) from the United States
 Karel van het Reve (1921–1999) from the Netherlands
 Blaže Koneski (1921–1993) from North Macedonia
 Juri Lotman (1922–1993) from Soviet Union/Estonia
 Henrik Birnbaum (1925–2002) from Poland/United States
 Vladislav Illich-Svitych (1934–1966) from Russia
 Thomas Schaub Noonan (1938–2001) from the United States
 Wolfgang Kasack (1927–2003) from Germany
 Isabel Margaret de Madariaga (1919–2014) from UK
 John Simon Gabriel Simmons  (1915–2005) from UK
 Pavle Ivić (1924–1999) from Serbia
 Edward Stankiewicz (1920–2013) from Poland/United States
 Nicholas V. Riasanovsky (1923–2011) Russian-American
 Alexander M. Schenker (1924–2019) from the United States
 Zoe Hauptová (1929–2012) from the Czech Republic
 Andrey Zaliznyak (1935–2017) from Russia
 Kenneth Naylor (1937–1992) from the United States
 Zbigniew Gołąb (1923–1994) from Poland
  (1928–2006) from Poland
 Tadeusz Lehr-Spławiński (1891–1965) from Poland
 Blaže Ristovski (1931–2018) from North Macedonia
 Radoslav Katičić (1930–2019) from Croatia
 Ivan Dorovský (1935–2021) from Czech Republic
  (1939–2021) from Poland
 Šárka B. Hrbková (1878–1948) Czech-American slavologist

Contemporary

 Irwin Weil (born 1928) from the United States
 Zuzanna Topolińska (born 1931) from Poland
 Vladimir Dybo (born 1930) from Russia
 Hakan Kırımlı (born 1958) from Turkey
 Stefan Brezinski (born 1932) from Bulgaria
  (born 1937) from Germany
 Boris Uspensky (born 1937) from Russia
 Branko Mikasinovich (born 1938) from the United States
 Mario Capaldo (born 1945) from Italy
 Frederik Kortlandt (born 1946) from Netherlands
 Gary Saul Morson (born 1948) from the United States
 Victor Friedman (born 1949) from the United States
 Christina Kramer (born  1950) from the United States
  (born 1952) from the Czech Republic
 Alexander F. Tsvirkun (born 1953) from Ukraine
 Snježana Kordić (born 1964) from Croatia
 Charles S. Kraszewski (born 1962) from the United States
 Marek Jan Chodakiewicz (born 1962) from Poland and the United States
 Alexandra Popoff (born 1959) from Russia
 Catriona Kelly (born 1959) from UK
 Aage Hansen-Löve (born 1947) from Austria

Journals and book series 

 Archiv für slavische Philologie
 The Russian Review
 Sarmatian Review
Slavic and East European Journal, published by the American Association of Teachers of Slavic and East European Languages
 Slavic Review, published by the American Association for the Advancement of Slavic Studies
 Studies in Slavic and General Linguistics
 The Slavonic and East European Review
 Scando-Slavica
 Wiener Slawistischer Almanach

Conferences 
American Association for the Advancement of Slavic Studies
American Association of Teachers of Slavic and East European Languages
Formal Approaches to Slavic Linguistics

Institutes and schools

Academic
 Institute for Slavic Studies of the Russian Academy of Sciences, Moscow, Russia
 Jan Stanislav Institute of Slavistics, Slovak Academy of Sciences, Bratislava, Slovakia
 Institute of Slavic Studies, Polish Academy of Sciences, Warsaw, Poland
 Institute of Slavonic Studies, Czech Academy of Sciences, Prague, Czechia

University
 Institute of Western and Southern Slavic Studies, University of Warsaw, Poland
 Institute of Slavonic Philology, Uniwersytet Śląski, Poland
 Institute of Slavonic Studies, Jagiellonian University, Poland
 Institute of Slavic Philology, University of Adam Mickiewicz, Poland
 Institute of Slavic Studies, University of Wroclaw, Poland
 Institute of Slavic Philology, Adam Mickiewicz University in Poznań, Poland
 Institute of Slavic Studies, Lviv University, Ukraine
 Department of Slavonic Philology, University of Tartu, Estonia
 Department of Slavic philology, University of Belgrade, Serbia
 Department of Slavistics, University of Novi Sad, Serbia
 Department of Russian and Slavonic Studies, Trinity College Dublin, Ireland 
 UCL School of Slavonic and East European Studies, University College London, United Kingdom
 Department of Russian and Slavonic Studies, University of Nottingham, United Kingdom
 Department of Slavic Languages & Literatures, Chengchi University, Taiwan
 Department of Slavic Languages and Literatures, Yale University, United States
 Institute of Slavic, East European, and Eurasian Studies, University of California at Berkeley, United States
 Department of Slavic Languages & Literatures, Harvard University, United States
 Department of Slavic Languages and Literatures, Stanford University, United States
 Slavic Department, Barnard College, United States
 Department of Slavic Languages and Literatures, University of Princeton, United States
 Department of Slavic Studies, Brown University, United States
 Department of Slavic Languages, Columbia University, United States
 Department of German, Nordic, and Slavic+, University of Wisconsin–Madison, United States
 Department of Slavic Languages and Literatures, Weinberg College of Arts and Sciences, United States
 Department of Slavic Languages & Literatures, University of Washington, United States
 Department of Slavic Languages & Literatures, University of Virginia, United States
 Department of Slavic Languages & Literatures, University of Pittsburgh, United States
 Department of Russian and Slavic Studies, University of Arizona, United States
 Department of Slavic and Eurasian Studies, University of Texas at Austin, United States
 Department of Slavic Languages and Literatures, University of Illinois Urbana-Champaign, United States
 Department of Slavic and Eurasian Studies, Duke University, United States
 Department of Slavic Languages, Georgetown University, United States
 Department of Slavic Languages and Literatures , University of Southern California, United States 
 Department of Slavic Languages & Literatures, University of Toronto, Canada
 Department of Germanic and Slavic Studies, University of Victoria, Canada
 Department of Germanic and Slavic Studies, University of Waterloo, Canada
 Department of Slavic Studies(Le département d’études slaves), Universite Paris 8, France
 Institute for Slavistics, University of Vienna, Austria
 Institute for Slavistics, University of Graz, Austria
 Department of Slavic Studies, University of Salzburg, Austria
 Department of Slavonic and Finno-Ugrian Studies, University of Delhi, India 
 Department of Slavic Studies, Comenius University, Slovakia
 Department of Russian Language and Literature & Slavic Studies, University of Athens, Greece
 Department of Slavistics, University of Ljubljana, Slovenia 
 Department of Slavic Languages and Literatures, University of Maribor, Slovenia
 Department of Slavonic Studies, University of Olomouc, Czechia
 Department of Slavonic Studies, Masaryk University, Czechia
 Department of Slavonic Studies, University of Ostrava, Czechia
 Department of Slavic Studies, Plovdiv University "Paisii Hilendarski", Bulgaria
 Department of Slavic Studies, Sofia University, Bulgaria
 Institute of Slavic Studies, Heidelberg University, Germany
 Institute of Slavic Studies, Justus-Liebig Universität Gießen, Germany
 Institute of Slavic Studies, University of Kiel, Germany
 Institute of Slavic Studies, University of Mainz, Germany
 Institute of Slavic Studies, University of Regensburg, Germany
 Institute of Slavic Studies, Westfälische Wilhelms-Universität Münster, Germany
 Institute of Slavic Studies, University of Hamburg, Germany
 Institute of Slavic Studies, Greifswald University, Germany
 Institute of Slavic Studies, Otto-Friedrich-Universität Bamberg, Germany
 Institute of Slavistics, Technische Universität Dresden, Germany
 Institute of Slavistics, University of Potsdam, Germany
 Institute for Slavic Studies, Humboldt University, Germany
 Institute of Slavic Languages and Literatures, Ludwig-Maximilians University Munich, Germany 
 Institute of Slavic Studies, University of Oldenburg, Germany 
 Department of Slavic Languages and Literatures, Ankara, Turkey 
 Institute of Slavic Studies, Tbilisi State University, Georgia
 Department of Russian and Slavic Philology(Departamentul de Filologie Rusă şi Slavă),  Romania 
 Department of Russian and Slavic Studies, Hebrew University of Jerusalem, Israel 
 Institute of Slavic Studies, University of Pécs, Hungary
 Institute of Slavonic and Baltic Philology, Eötvös Loránd University, Hungary
 Institute of Slavic Philology, University of Szeged, Hungary
 Resource Center for Medieval Slavic Studies, Ohio State University, United States
Núcleo de Estudos em Eslavística, Federal University of Rio de Janeiro, Brazil
Núcleo de Estudos Eslavos, Universidade Estadual do Centro-Oeste, Brazil

Others
 Old Church Slavonic Institute, Zagreb, Croatia
 Ghent Centre for Slavic and East European Studies, Ghent, Belgium

Organisations
American Association of Teachers of Slavic and East European Languages (AATSEEL)
 Association for Slavic, East European, and Eurasian Studies (ASEEES)
 American Council of Teachers of Russian (ACTR)

See also 
 Balkan studies
 Indo-European studies
 Byzantine studies
 List of linguists
 Outline of Slavic history and culture

References

Sources

External links 

 Canadian Association of Slavists 
 List of Journals in Russian, Eurasian, and East European Studies at Slavic Review
 Association for Slavic, East European, and Eurasian Studies (ASEEES)
 Slavistik-Portal The Slavistics Portal (Germany)
 
 
 Association of Slavists POLYSLAV
 Slavic Linguistics Society

Library guides
 Slavonic and East European studies: a guide to resources (British Library)
 
 Slavic Studies Guide (Duke)
 Slavic Studies: A Research Guide (Harvard)
 Slavic and East European Resources (University of Illinois)
 
 
 Slavic Studies Guide (NYU)
 
 
 
 Guides to Resources. University College London, School of Slavonic & East European Studies
 Slavic & East European Collections (Yale)

 
Ethnography
European folklore
European studies
Indo-European studies